Henry Victor (2 October 1892 – 15 March 1945) was an English-born character actor who had his highest profile in the film silent era, he appeared in numerous film roles in Britain, before emigrating to the US in 1939 where he continued his career.

Biography

Victor was born in London, England, but was raised in Germany, he made his film debut as Prince Andreas in The King's Romance (1914). He appeared in literary interpreted pieces such as The Picture of Dorian Gray (1916) and the Graham Cutts-directed The White Shadow (1923). Victor is probably best remembered for his portrayal of the circus strongman Hercules in Tod Browning's film Freaks (1932). The role was originally considered for Victor McLaglen, with whom Browning had worked previously. Victor emigrated to America in 1939.

Never a leading man in sound films mainly due to his difficult to interpret accent, he established later in his career, and with the advent of talkies, many character roles, in which he mostly portrayed villains or Nazis in both American and British films with his trademark German accent such as the Ernst Lubitsch film, To Be or Not to Be (1942).

Death
Victor died in 1945, aged 52, from a brain tumor. He is buried in Chatsworth, California, at the Oakwood Memorial Park Cemetery.

Filmography

 The King's Romance (1914) - Prince Andreas
 She (1916) - Leo Vincey
 The Picture of Dorian Gray (1916) - Dorian Gray
 Ora Pro Nobis (1917) - Lord Osborne
 The Secret Woman (1918) - Jesse Redvers
 The Heart of a Rose (1919) - Dick Darrell
 The Call of the Sea (1919)
 A Lass o' the Looms (1919) - Jack Brown
 ¡Cuidado con los ladrones! (1919)
 Calvary (1920) - David Penryn
 As God Made Her (1920) - Seward Pendyne
 John Heriot's Wife (1920) - John Heriot
 Beyond the Dreams of Avarice (1920) - Dr. Lucien Calvert
 Sheer Bluff (1921) - Maurice Hardacre
 The Old Wives' Tale (1921) - Gerald
 Bentley's Conscience (1922) - Fletcer
 A Romance of Old Baghdad (1922) - Horne Jerningham
 Diana of the Crossways (1922) - Hon. Percy Dacier
 A Bill of Divorcement (1922) - Grey Meredith
 The Crimson Circle (1922)
 The Prodigal Son (1923) - Oscar Stephenson
 The Scandal (1923) - Artenezzo
 The Royal Oak (1923) - Charles I / Charles II
 The Colleen Bawn (1924) - Hardress Cregan
 Henry, King of Navarre (1924) - Duc de Guise
 Slaves of Destiny (1924) - Ralph Warriner
 The White Shadow (1924) - Louis Chadwick
 His Grace Gives Notice (1924) - George Berwick
 The Love Story of Aliette Brunton (1924) - Ronald Cavendish
 The Sins Ye Do (1924) - Ronald Hillier
 A Romance of Mayfair (1925) - Jack Dinneford
 The White Monkey (1925) - Wilfrid Desert
 Braveheart (1925) - Sam Harris
 Mulhall's Greatest Catch (1926) - Otto Nelson
 Crossed Signals (1926) - Jack McDermott
 The Beloved Rogue (1927) - Thibault d'Aussigny
 The Fourth Commandment (1927) - Gordon Graham
 Topsy and Eva (1927) - St. Claire
 The Luck of the Navy (1927) - Lt. Clive Stanton
 The Guns of Loos (1928) - John Grimlaw
 Tommy Atkins (1928) - Victor
 L'Argent (1928) - Jacques Hamelin
 After the Verdict (1929) - Mr. Sabine - der fremde Mann
 Down Channel (1929) - Smiler
 Diane (1929) - Oberst Guy de Lasalle
 The Hate Ship (1929) - Count Boris Ivanoff
 Song of Soho (1930) - Henry
 Are You There? (1930) - International crook
 One Heavenly Night (1931) - Almady, the Officer
 Seas Beneath (1931) - Baron Ernst von Steuben (U-boat commander)
 Suicide Fleet (1931) - Captain Von Schlettow
 Freaks (1932) - Hercules
 World and the Flesh (1932) - Revolutionary (uncredited)
 The Mummy (1932) - The Saxon Warrior (scenes deleted)
 Luxury Liner (1933) - Baron von Luden
 The Scotland Yard Mystery (1934) - Floyd
 Tiger Bay (1934) - Olaf
 I Spy (1934) - KPO
 The Way of Youth (1934) - M. Sylvestre
 Murder at Monte Carlo (1935) - Major
 Handle with Care (1935) - Count Paul
 Can You Hear Me, Mother? (1935) - Father
 The Secret Voice (1936) - Brandt
 Fame (1936) - Actor
 Conquest of the Air (1936) - Otto Lilienthal
 The Great Barrier (1937) - Bulldog Kelly
 Our Fighting Navy (1937) - Lt. d'Enriquo
 Holiday's End (1937) - Major Zwanenberg
 Fine Feathers (1937) - Gibbons
 Hotel Imperial (1939) - Sultanov (uncredited)
 Confessions of a Nazi Spy (1939) - Wildebrandt
 Nurse Edith Cavell (1939) - Jaubec (uncredited)
 Thunder Afloat (1939) - German U-boat Officer
 Espionage Agent (1939) - Foreign Official (uncredited)
 We're in the Army Now (1939) - Col. Schlager
 Nick Carter, Master Detective (1939) - J. Lester Hammil
 Zanzibar (1940) - Mate Simpson
 Enemy Agent (1940) - Karl (uncredited)
 The Mortal Storm (1940) - Gestapo Official Confiscating Book on Train (uncredited)
 Mystery Sea Raider (1940) - Cmdr. Bulow
 Spring Parade (1940) - Dutch Officer (uncredited)
 Seven Sinners (1940) - Dutch Police Officer (uncredited)
 Escape (1940) - Gestapo Officer with Hooked Nose (uncredited)
 Charter Pilot (1940) - Faber
 The Mad Doctor (1941) - Furber (uncredited)
 King of the Zombies (1941) - Dr. Miklos Sangre
 Underground (1941) - Gestapo Agent (uncredited)
 Dangerously They Live (1941) - U-boat Captain Horst (uncredited)
 Blue, White and Perfect (1942) - Rudolf Hagerman
 All Through the Night (1942) - Meeting Receptionist (uncredited)
 To Be or Not to Be (1942) - Captain Schultz
 The Wife Takes a Flyer (1942) - Col. Bosch (uncredited)
 Desperate Journey (1942) - Heinrich Schwarzmueller
 Once Upon a Honeymoon (1942) - German Storm Trooper (uncredited)
 Underground Agent (1942) - Johann Schrode
 Sherlock Holmes and the Secret Weapon (1942) - Professor Frederic Hoffner (uncredited)
 They Got Me Covered (1943) - Staeger (uncredited)
 Don Winslow of the Coast Guard (1943) - Heilrich
 Mission to Moscow (1943) - Herr Schufeldt - Hamburg Official (uncredited)
 Nazty Nuisance (1943) - Kapitan von Popoff
 Above Suspicion (1943) - German Officer (uncredited)
 The Cross of Lorraine (1943) - Minor Role (uncredited)
 Betrayal from the East (1945) - Brunzman (uncredited)
 A Royal Scandal (1945) - Russian General (uncredited) (final film role)

References

External links

 
 

1892 births
1945 deaths
English people of German descent
English male film actors
English male silent film actors
Burials at Oakwood Memorial Park Cemetery
Deaths from cancer in California
Deaths from brain cancer in the United States
Male actors from London
20th-century English male actors
British expatriate male actors in the United States